Pliny T. Merrick (August 2, 1794 – January 31, 1867) was an American attorney and politician from Massachusetts. He served as an associate justice of the Massachusetts Supreme Judicial Court.

Early life
Merrick was born in Brookfield, Massachusetts, the son of Honorable Pliny Merrick and Ruth (Cutler) Merrick. He graduated from Harvard Law School  
in 1814, and was admitted to the Worcester bar in 1817. He began the practice of law in Worcester, before moving to Charlton, Swansea and Taunton to practice law. In June, 1824, he returned to Worcester and served as Worcester County's district attorney from 1824-1843.  In 1826, Merrick was elected a member of the American Antiquarian Society.

Judicial career
In 1844 he was Judge of the Municipal Court, and in 1843 he was named a judge of the Massachusetts Courts of Common Pleas. He resigned this appointment in 1848, and was reappointed in 1851.

From 1849-1850, he was senior defense counsel (co-counsel with Edward Dexter Sohier) in the trial of Harvard University Professor John White Webster, accused of murdering Harvard patron Dr. George Parkman. The prosecutors for the trial were John H. Clifford, then Massachusetts Attorney-General and the prosecutor of all capital murder cases, and George Bemis, Esq, and independent attorney. In 1853, Merrick was promoted to the bench of the Supreme Judicial Court by the same John H. Clifford, now Governor of Massachusetts. Merrick received the degree of LL.D. from Harvard in 1853. He served on the bench of the Massachusetts Supreme Judicial Court until 1864.

He was a representative of Worcester County in both branches of the state legislature.  He was an Overseer of Harvard University from 1852-1856. He also served for two years as president of the Worcester and Nashua Railroad. In 1855 Merrick moved to Boston and lived there until his death in 1867.

John White Webster Trial
From 1849-1850 Merrick was senior defense counsel in the Parkman-Webster murder case. The gruesome murder drew national attention and although Merrick lost the case, he received much notoriety for the case.

The Boston Globe reported Merrick's response, that upon the verdict, "In a moment or two, his senior counsel, Judge Merrick, to the dock, and addressed a few words to the prisoner, to which, so far as we could judge, he replied.— Judge Merrick was deeply affected, and so agitated that he could hardly stand."

Anti-Masonic Movement
Merrick was an active promoter of the Anti-Masonic Party. The party developed in the early nineteenth century, opposing political leaders who were members of secretive Masonic brotherhoods. Masonic members held political views on the role of the government and how the country should expand. The Anti-Masonic Party opposed those views as moving away from the original founding fathers intent. Merrick renounced Free Masonry in 1832. The party was the precursor to the Whig Party.

Death
Merrick died of paralysis in Boston on January 31, 1867, in his 73rd year. His obituary in the New York Times (2/4/1867) stated:  "In 1864 an attack of paralysis obliged him to resign his seat on the Bench.  His mind, however, had remained unclouded until a second and fatal attack..."  He bequeathed a fund for the establishment of schools of high grade in Worcester.

Family life
On May 23, 1827, Merrick married Rebecca Thomas, daughter of Isaiah Thomas, Jr. of Worcester; she died June 17, 1859. They had no children.

His niece Alice Miller Rice married U.S. Congressman William W. Rice.

References

Further reading
 "A Dictionary of Freemasonry" by Robert Macoy, published by Mercy Books, NY. 2000.
 "The Disappearance of Dr. Parkman" by Judge Pliny T. Merrick, published by Robert Sullivan, Little, Brown and Company, Boston 1971.

External links
 
 History and Purpose of the Freemasons and other Secret Societies

	

1794 births
1867 deaths
People from Brookfield, Massachusetts
Harvard Law School alumni
Massachusetts lawyers
Anti-Masonic Party politicians from Massachusetts
Politicians from Worcester, Massachusetts
District attorneys in Worcester County, Massachusetts
Massachusetts Whigs
19th-century American politicians
Massachusetts state senators
Members of the Massachusetts House of Representatives
Justices of the Massachusetts Supreme Judicial Court
Massachusetts state court judges
Members of the American Antiquarian Society
19th-century American judges
19th-century American lawyers